Alex Lightbody (born 1966) is an international lawn bowler, who has represented Ireland (combined) and Northern Ireland at international level.

Bowls career
Lightbody won the Irish National Bowls Championships singles in 1992. Trailing in the final against Gary McCloy 14–9, he came back to secure a 21–15 victory. In doing so he became the first Bangor bowler since Billy Tate to win the title.

The 1992 Irish title qualified him for the 1993  British Isles Bowls Championships and he subsequently won the singles held in Worthing  becoming the first Irish winner since David Corkill in 1980.

Other titles
Northern Ireland Bowls Association (NIBA) singles title: 1992
Northern Ireland Bowls Association (NIBA) fours title: 1983

European ranking
Lightbody has a Professional Bowls Association European ranking of 96 in 2021.

References

1966 births
Living people
Male lawn bowls players from Northern Ireland